PP-110 Faisalabad-XIV is a Constituency of Provincial Assembly of Punjab.

General elections 2013

In the general elections of 2013, Faqeer Hussain Doger (PMLN) won the elections of PP-67.

General elections 2008

See also
 PP-109 Faisalabad-XIII
 PP-111 Faisalabad-XV

References

External links
 Election commission Pakistan's official website
 Awazoday.com check result
 Official Website of Government of Punjab

Provincial constituencies of Punjab, Pakistan